Oreonana is a small genus of flowering plants in the carrot family known generally as mountainparsleys. All three species are endemic to high mountain ranges in California. They are petite, cushionlike mat-forming perennial herbs.

, the Germplasm Resources Information Network considered that it may be a synonym of Cymopterus.

Species:
Oreonana clementis - pygmy mountainparsley
Oreonana purpurascens - purple mountainparsley
Oreonana vestita - woolly mounainparsley

References

External links 
 Jepson Manual Treatment
 USDA Plants Profile

Apioideae